''For railway stations in the Perth metropolitan area see:- List of closed Perth railway stations

List of Closed railway stations in Western Australia - this list deals with former railway stations in Western Australia, some of which only platforms or fences might be the only visual remains.

The railway network of the Western Australian Government Railways at its furthest and longest reach through the state of Western Australia peaked in the early 1950s before a range of closures on non-paying lines saw considerable amounts of line and property removal.

This list of stations that are no longer used includes stations completely removed, and those which have parts of their operating structure remaining.

Considerable numbers of stopping places on the railway network were unstaffed by railway personnel, and simply constituted a shed. 
This list attempts to identify stations which included more than one shed with more than one space inside.

Some railway stations are now used for other purposes - the use where known is put after the name.
Some examples in the Wheatbelt region are.
Narrogin,
Cuballing,
Yornaning,
Popanyinning,
Carraching,
Pingelly,
Kulyaling,
Brookton,
Youraling,
Mt Kokeby,
Beverley,
Edwards crossing,
Addington,
Gilgering crossing,
Gwambygine,
Qualen,
York,
Mackies crossing,
Burges,
Hamersley,
Muresk,
Spencers brook,
Spring hill,
Northam.

List

 Boorabbin
 Boulder
 Busselton - see also Busselton to Flinders Bay Railway Rail Trail
 Clackline
 Chidlow
 Geraldton
 Hopetoun
 Margaret River
 Meekatharra
 Nannup - see also Nannup Branch Railway
 Nornalup
 Northam - Old Northam Railway Station now Railway and General Museum
 Ravensthorpe
 Spencers Brook
 Wiluna - see also Wiluna Branch Railway
 Wundowie
 Yalgoo

See also
 List of Perth railway stations

References

Further reading
 Higham, G.J.(2006)'Where WAS that? : an historical gazetteer of Western Australia'  Winthrop, W.A. Geoproject Solutions. 2nd ed. 

Closed railway stations in Western Australia
Western Australia